Bekim Fehmiu (1 June 1936 – 15 June 2010) was a Yugoslavian theater and film actor. He was the first Eastern European actor to star in Hollywood during the Cold War, and one of the internationally best-known ethnic Albanian actors.

Biography

Early life
Fehmiu was born in Sarajevo, into an ethnic Albanian family originating from Gjakova, Kosovo. His father Ibrahim adopted his high-school nickname Fehmiu as a surname replacing the original Imer Halili. The family moved to Shkodër, Albania, where they spent three years, and in 1941 returned to Prizren where Bekim spent his childhood. He was part of the acting club at his high school in Prizren, and after graduation he became a member of County Popular Theatre in Prisina, the only professional Albanian language theatre in Yugoslavia. He graduated from the Faculty of Dramatic Arts (FDU) in Belgrade in 1960.

Acting career
In 1960, Fehmiu became a member of the Yugoslav Drama Theatre in Belgrade, which he left in 1967, citing bad treatment, to become a free artist.

Fehmiu's big break was the 1967 film I Even Met Happy Gypsies, a subtle portrayal of Roma life which won two awards in Cannes and was nominated for an Oscar. Known for his macho appearance and mild manner, Fehmiu was then wooed by Western filmmakers and signed a contract with the Academy Award-winning producer Dino De Laurentiis. It was De Laurentiis who, in 1968, cast him as Odysseus in the acclaimed mini-series of The Odyssey. It was the first blockbuster of Italian television and made Fehmiu an icon in parts of Europe.

Fehmiu seemed poised for stardom in Hollywood as well, but his first American film, The Adventurers, was a critical and financial disaster which "ruined any chances for Fehmiu to achieve similar stardom in Hollywood". In 1971, Fehmiu starred in the western action drama The Deserter, directed by Burt Kennedy. In 1973 he played the role of the busy father in Raimondo Del Balzo's heartbreaking film The Last Snows of Spring, and then in 1975 played the role of ex-politician Alexander Diakim in the movie Permission to Kill, with Ava Gardner and Dirk Bogarde. In 1976, Fehmiu starred as fictional murdered Luftwaffe pilot, Hans Reiter in Tinto Brass's film, Salon Kitty alongside Helmut Berger, Ingrid Thulin and Teresa Ann Savoy.  He portrayed a Palestinian terrorist in John Frankenheimer's 1977 political thriller, Black Sunday. Despite his Hollywood films achieving little success, he did well in European art house cinema as well as in the theatre, the latter being his preferred medium. He portrayed the father of Mother Teresa, Nikola Boyaxhiu, in the 1982 film La Voce (The Voice). He acted as Joseph in the Italian production A Child Called Jesus (1987). He was to have acted in the movie Genghis Khan (1992), but it was ultimately never made.

In 1987, in protest at the Yugoslavian government's treatment of Kosovar Albanians, he walked off the stage at the Yugoslav Drama Theatre in Belgrade during the play Madame Kollontai by Agneta Pleijel. He left the stage, and soon after, film.

Personal life
Fehmiu was married to Serbian actress Branka Petrić. The couple had two sons, Hedon and Uliks, and resided in the Zvezdara area of Belgrade.  is also an actor.

Death

Fehmiu was found dead on 15 June 2010 in his apartment in Belgrade. Initial reports stated he committed suicide. Interior Minister Ivica Dačić said Fehmiu was found shot in his apartment and the gun was registered in Fehmiu's name. He was 74 years old. His body was cremated and the ashes were scattered in Prizren Bistrica in Prizren, his childhood home.

Legacy
The New York Times dubbed Fehmiu the "Yugoslav heart-throb" for his youthful conquests and acquaintances with the likes of Brigitte Bardot and Ava Gardner. Decades after his last appearance on the screen, readers of a leading Italian women's magazine voted him one of the ten most attractive men of the 20th century.

Fehmiu appeared in 41 films between 1953 and 1998. He was one of the first Albanian theater and film actors to act in theaters and movies all over Yugoslavia, with Abdurrahman Shala, Faruk Begolli and Enver Petrovci, appearing in a series of roles that changed the history of the Cinema of Yugoslavia and left a mark in the artistic developments elsewhere. By the end of his career he had acted in film productions in nine languages, including Balkan languages, French, Spanish, English and Italian.

In 2001, Samizdat B92 published a book of Bekim Fehmiu's memoirs, entitled Blistavo i strašno (Brilliant and Terrifying), which describes his life until 1955, the year he became an actor.

Filmography

Film

Television

References

External links

1936 births
2010 suicides
Yugoslav people of Albanian descent
People from Prizren
Male actors from Belgrade
Suicides by firearm in Serbia
Yugoslav male television actors
Yugoslav male film actors
Yugoslav Albanians
2010 deaths